King Salman Humanitarian Aid and Relief Center (KSRelief) was established by King Salman bin Abdulaziz in 2015. The Supervisor General of the KSRelief is Abdullah bin Abdulaziz Al Rabeeah. The center was established in the framework of the Saudi’s efforts to alleviate the suffering of those in need worldwide. According to KSRelief, the organization has helped 79 countries and spent $5.65 billion on 1,919 projects.

References 

Charities based in Saudi Arabia